Sorry We Missed You is a 2019 drama film written by Paul Laverty and directed by Ken Loach.

Principal photography began in Newcastle upon Tyne and the surrounding areas in September 2018. It was selected to compete for the Palme d'Or at the 2019 Cannes Film Festival. Despite having a broken arm in a sling, the 82-year-old Loach appeared at Cannes to promote the film and announce that it would be his final film to compete at the festival. At the 10th Magritte Awards, Sorry We Missed You received the Magritte Award for Best Foreign Film in Coproduction. At the 13th Gaudí Awards, it won the Gaudí Award for Best European Film.

Plot
Ricky Turner and his family have been fighting an uphill struggle against debt since the 2008 financial crash.

With no education or professional training, Ricky is given an opportunity when he is hired to run a franchise as a self-employed delivery driver under the supervision of Maloney, a tough, no-nonsense employer. In order to afford a van for the job, Ricky convinces his wife Abbie to sell the family car, even though she uses it in her work as a home care nurse.

The stress of the new job proves to be too great for Ricky. He is always under pressure to make his deliveries in time and is fined if he is late or makes mistakes. Abbie also finds her work much more demanding without a car and frequently feels upset by the lack of time she is allowed to spend with her patients due to her demanding schedule.

During this period, Ricky's rebellious son Seb skips school and often gets into trouble with his use of graffiti. Following a fight with his parents, Seb angrily tags over the family portraits during the night. When Ricky can't find the keys to his van the next morning, he blames Seb. Though Seb denies any wrongdoing, Ricky hits him at the end of a heated argument. Liza Jane, Seb's younger sister, later tearfully admits that she hid the keys as she blames Ricky's job for the family's problems.

Back at work, Ricky is robbed and brutally assaulted while making deliveries. While Ricky is in the waiting room at hospital, a furious Maloney phones him and explains that he is facing fines of over £1,000 as his barcode scanner was stolen in the assault. While Seb finally warms up and re-joins the family, a desperate and grievously injured Ricky drives off to work in tears as his family begs him to not leave.

Cast

 Kris Hitchen as Ricky Turner 
 Debbie Honeywood as Abby Turner
 Rhys Stone as Seb Turner
 Katie Proctor as Liza Jane Turner
 Ross Brewster as Maloney
 Charlie Richmond as Henry
 Julian Ions as Freddie
 Sheila Dunkerley as Rosie
 Maxie Peters as Robert
 Christopher John Slater as Ben
 Heather Wood as Mollie
 Alberto Dumba as Harpoon
 Natalia Stonebanks as Roz
 Jordan Collard as Dodge 
 Dave Turner as Magpie
 Stephen Clegg as Policeman 
 Darren Jones as Council worker
 Nikki Marshall as Traffic warden 
 Linda E Greenwood as Driver
 Linda Wright as A&E receptionist
 Mary Shearer as Woman at Door

Reception
The film grossed £6.3 million.

The site's critical consensus reads "Sorry We Missed You may strike some as tending toward the righteously didactic, but director Ken Loach's passionate approach remains effective." Metacritic, which uses a weighted average, assigned the film a score of 83 out of 100, based on 26 critics, indicating "universal acclaim".

David Rooney in The Hollywood Reporter wrote that the film "is an expertly judged and profoundly humane movie, made without frills or fuss but startlingly direct in its emotional depiction of the tough stuff that is the fiber of so many ordinary lives."

Peter Bradshaw in The Guardian believed it was superior to Loach's previous film I, Daniel Blake (2016), which won the Palme d'Or at Cannes. Bradshaw wrote: "it is more dramatically varied and digested, with more light and shade in its narrative progress and more for the cast to do collectively. I was hit in the solar plexus by this movie, wiped out by the simple honesty and integrity of the performances." The review in The Times praised the performance of newcomer Debbie Honeywood as Abbie, who was cast after a talent search of non-professionals. Contributor Kevin Maher believed the film should have concentrated on her character instead of Ricky, Abbie's husband.

Geoffrey Macnab wrote in The Independent that Loach's film "captures brilliantly the alienation and existential anguish that its main characters feel. There is nothing they can do to help themselves. The more they fight to change their circumstances, the worse those circumstances become." Macnab commented that Loach and his screenwriter Laverty "pursue their story to its logical conclusion, ending the film in a way that is both ingenious and devastating."

Owen Gleiberman of Variety writes: "Loach stages all of this with supreme confidence and flow" leading to "a fraught, touching, and galvanizing movie." Raphael Abrahams, in his review for the Financial Times, states: "In the end credits he [Loach] gives thanks to those drivers whose testimony informed the film but who wished to remain anonymous. He is their much-needed voice and remains that of our moral conscience."

Trevor Johnston of British film publication Sight & Sound wrote "While Sorry We Missed You may not be as sentimentally affecting as I, Daniel Blake, it delivers a more nuanced, troubling and provocative state-of-the-nation address. As such, it’s surely among Loach and Laverty’s most sinewy efforts."

References

External links
 
 

2019 films
2019 drama films
British Film Institute films
BBC Film films
France 2 Cinéma films
British drama films
French drama films
English-language French films
Belgian drama films
English-language Belgian films
Films directed by Ken Loach
Films scored by George Fenton
Social realism in film
Welfare in England
Films about poverty in the United Kingdom
Films set in Newcastle upon Tyne
Films set in the 2000s
Films set in 2009
Magritte Award winners
2010s English-language films
2010s British films
2010s French films